Pedal-powered vehicle may refer to:

Air
 Human-powered aircraft
 Human-powered airship
 Human-powered helicopter

Amphibious
 Amphibious cycle

Land
 Bicycle
 Bicycle trailer
 BMX bike
 Boneshaker (bicycle)
 Cargo bike
 City bicycle
 Cruiser bicycle
 Cycle rickshaw
 Cyclo-cross bicycle
 Fatbike
 Flat bar road bike
 Folding bicycle
 Go kart
 Hotchkiss Bicycle Railroad
 Hybrid bicycle
 Model car
 Mountain bike
 Party bike
 Pedelec
 Penny-farthing
 Porteur bicycle
 Prone bicycle
 Quadracycle
 Recumbent bicycle
 Road bicycle
 Roadster (bicycle)
 Safety bicycle
 Small wheel bicycle
 Tandem bicycle
 Touring bicycle
 Trailer bike
 Tricycle
 Unicycle
 Utility bicycle
 Velocar
 Velocipede
 Velomobile

Water
 Hydrocycle
 Pedalo